Gowers Report may refer to:
 A number of reports by Ernest Gowers (1880–1966)
Gowers Review of Intellectual Property, by Andrew Gowers, 2006

See also
Gowers, a surname